Carmen Farala (born November 3, 1990) is the stage name of Daniel Mora, a Spanish drag performer best known for winning the first season of Drag Race España.

Early life 
Mora was born in Seville, Spain.

Career 
Carmen Farala competed on the first season of Drag Race España. She is a part of the drag singing-dancing girl group "Hermanas Farala".

Personal life 
Mora lives in Madrid, as of 2021.

Filmography

Television

Web series

Awards and nominations

References

External links

 
 

1990 births
Living people
Drag Race España winners
People from Madrid
People from Seville
Spanish drag queens